Altimurat Orazdurdiev (June 16, 1969 – 1997) was a Turkmen former weightlifter and an Honoured Master of Sports of the USSR.

Early life 
He was born in the Mary region of Sakarchaga, one of five brothers. He graduated from the National Institute of Sports and Tourism of Turkmenistan.

Career 
Orazdurdiev was coached by Abrahamian Brono. He performed for the "Dynamo" (Ashgabat).

He was the first Turkman weightlifter to ever win the European Championship three times and has been recognized an equal number of times as the strongest man in the world. He performed in several 66–72 kg weight categories.

In 1992, he was a member of the United Team at the Olympic Games in Barcelona. However, head coach Vasily Alexeev did not allow him to compete.

A year after the Olympics he underwent a kidney transplant, but the transplant was rejected.

He won a gold medal at the 1994 Asian Games in the 76 kg class.

Orazdurdiev died in 1997 at the age of twenty-seven.

External links
 Altimurat Orazdurdiev at Lift Up

Turkmenistan male weightlifters
1969 births
1997 deaths
Asian Games medalists in weightlifting
Weightlifters at the 1994 Asian Games
Honoured Masters of Sport of the USSR
Asian Games gold medalists for Turkmenistan
Kidney transplant recipients
Medalists at the 1994 Asian Games